Donald M. Kerr may refer to:

 Donald Kerr (Donald MacLean Kerr, born 1939), American intelligence officer
 Donald M. Kerr (conservationist) (1946–2015), wildlife biologist and conservationist